The Wedge,  el. , is a small mountain range southeast of Cameron, Montana in Madison County, Montana.  It is a sub-range of the Madison Range.

See also
 List of mountain ranges in Montana

Notes

Mountain ranges of Montana
Landforms of Madison County, Montana